My Dog Shep is a 1946 American drama film directed by Ford Beebe.

It was made by Golden Gate Productions and released through the newly-formed Screen Guild Productions. They had just made Flight to Nowhere.

Filming started August 15, 1946. Greg McClure was meant to be in the cast. Lanny Rees was borrowed from RKO.

Plot
Danny, an orphan, tries to find a home along with his dog, Shep.  He goes to live with a mean Uncle Matt but loving Aunt Carrie.  Cousin Arthur squeals on him that he secretly has been keeping a German Shepherd that he named Shep.  Danny runs away with his dog.

Elderly Carter lives with his son who overhears his daughter-in-law bitterly complaining about him.  Carter tells his son he will move to the Soldier's Home and leaves that same day.  Along the road Danny and Carter cross paths and join up.  Both were not wanted where they lived and they bond.

Uncle Matt was happy Danny was gone until an attorney arrives and tells him Danny is to inherit $100,000.  He now offers a $500 reward to find Danny Barker and his dog, Shep.  Carter sees the reward in the paper and Danny tells him he does not want to return to his uncle's farm.  While Carter is in town for supplies, he sends a telegram to the estate attorney.  The Sheriff now has a way to find the boy.

While Danny is swimming, he is discovered by tomboy Lorna.  Her Dad is the District Attorney and she is kidnapped to affect a gangster's indictment.  Danny is kidnapped as well but Shep tracks them down.  Carter saw the kidnappers and the Sheriff is following him to get the boy so all together they are successful rescuing Lorna.

All the parties are in the judge's chambers to discuss Danny's adoption.  Uncle Matt now wants the boy for his money and his mean character is exposed.  Carter explains he was not aiding a runaway.  He did not seek the reward.  He and Danny and his dog found comfort with one another.  The Judge decides the DA family would be best for Danny.  As they leave the Court, Shep goes up to Carter to pull him back with Danny and he is welcomed into the new family as well.

Cast

Reception
The film was popular. Flame, the dog who starred in the film, went on to star in Out of the Blue, the Rusty series of movies (starting with For the Love of Rusty), and the My Pal series of shorts.

He was also in the sequel, Shep Comes Home (1948).

References

External links 

My Dog Shep at BFI

1946 films
American black-and-white films
1946 drama films
American drama films
Lippert Pictures films
Films about dogs
Films about pets
Films directed by Ford Beebe
1940s English-language films
1940s American films